Flint Northwestern High School was a high school in Flint, Michigan, United States that served grades nine through twelve. It was part of Flint Community Schools and opened in 1964.

In July 2018, the campus was repurposed as Flint Junior High School, which serves grades seven and eight, while its former high school students were relocated to Flint Southwestern Academy.

History

The school first opened in September 1964. After initial construction, the school was dedicated to the Flint Community Schools Board of Education by Claude E. Stout. Further additions to the building were a swimming pool in November 1964 and the Guy V. Houston football stadium in the fall of 1967.

The high school's official mascot was the wildcat. The official school colors were green and white.

In 1999, Flint Community Schools entered into a contract with EdisonLearning, Inc. (formerly known as Edison Schools, Inc.), the country's leading private manager of public schools, in order to improve the school and boost student performance. Flint Northwestern High School became an EdisonLearning partnership school, and its official name became Flint Northwestern-Edison Community High School. In 2005, the contract was not renewed and Flint Community Schools gave the high school its present name: Flint Northwestern Preparatory Academy.  
The district officially closed the school ahead of the 2018–2019 school year. In July 2018, Flint Community Schools opened the district's first junior high school at the site.

Academics

Flint Northwestern Academy was a state and nationally accredited school through the AdvancED/North Central Accreditation of Colleges and Schools.

Demographics

Flint Northwestern High School profile 2013/2014:

Athletics

Boys

Boys' basketball

1975 Class A State Runner-up
1984 Class A State Champion
1985 Class A State Champion
1988 Class A State Runner-up

Boys' track and field

1975 Class A State Runner-up

Girls

Girls' basketball

1983 Class A State Champion
1984 Class A State Champion
1985 Class A State Runner-up
1992 Class A State Runner-up
1993 Class A State Champion

See also
 Flint Community Schools
 Flint Central - closed 2009
 Flint Northern - closed 2013
 Flint Southwestern Academy

References

High schools in Flint, Michigan
Educational institutions established in 1964
Public high schools in Michigan
1964 establishments in Michigan